Henry Taylor (born 1958) is an American artist and painter who lives and works in Los Angeles, California. He is best known for his acrylic paintings, mixed media sculptures, and installations.

Life
Henry Taylor was born the youngest of eight brothers and sisters, which earned him the nickname "Henry VIII", in Ventura, California, to a father who was employed by the U.S. government as a commercial painter and is listed as a painter on Henry's birth certificate. Raised in Oxnard, California, Henry took art classes at Oxnard College under James Jarvaise, who became an ongoing mentor. His brother, Randy, was a founding member of the Ventura County chapter of the Black Panthers.

After 10 years of working as a psychiatric technician at Camarillo State Mental Hospital, Taylor retired in 1997. He attended the California Institute for the Arts, where in 1995, he obtained his Bachelor's of Fine Art.

Work
Taylor's largest output of work is in portraiture: he is known to paint obsessively, on various materials, including empty cigarette packs, detergent boxes, cereal boxes, suitcases, crates, bottles, furniture, and stretched canvas.
His subjects include family, friends, patients (when employed at the hospital), acquaintances, strangers, waitresses, celebrities, homeless people, himself, historical figures, cultural figures, sports heroes, politicians, and individuals from photographs or other art works.
At times, Taylor collapses time periods and spaces, as in Cicely and Miles Visit the Obamas (2017): in this work, Cicely Tyson and Miles Davis—painted after a famous photograph of the couple from 1968—are seen in front of the White House, alluding to their imaginary visit to the Obamas. Taylor's painterly style has been variously described as sensuous, vibrant, bold, fast and loose, full of empathy, generosity, and love, and the visual equivalent to blues music, while retaining a profound critical social sensibility.
His work has been lauded for maintaining an impossible balance between careful and sophisticated art-world references with a seemingly spontaneous and natural expressiveness. 
Taylor's oeuvre has been aligned within various American lineages, including the portraiture tradition of Alice Neel, and the work of Harlem Renaissance painters such as Jacob Lawrence and Romare Bearden, and compared with his peer Kerry James Marshall.

One of Taylor's more recent works, The Times Ain't A Changing, Fast Enough! captures the events of the shooting of Philando Castile, who was shot and killed in his own car with his girlfriend and 4-year-old.

Taylor showed work that delved into the old practice of the Master's Golf Tournament using Black only caddies in a show titled: "Disappeared, but A Tiger Showed Up, Later" at Hauser & Wirth, Southampton.

Exhibitions 
Taylor's important exhibitions include a mid-career retrospective at MoMA PS1, along with solo exhibitions at the Studio Museum in Harlem, Artpace, and the Santa Monica Museum of Art, along with group exhibitions at the Whitney Museum of American Art, the Corcoran Gallery of Art, the Museum of Contemporary Art, Los Angeles, the Hammer Museum, the Carnegie Museum of Art, the Rubell Museum, and the Bruce High Quality Foundation. Taylor is represented by Blum & Poe Gallery in Los Angeles and Feur Mesler gallery in New York.

He was awarded the Robert De Niro, Sr. Prize for his achievements in Painting.

Art market
Taylor is represented by Hauser & Wirth (since 2020) and Blum & Poe.

Quotes 
“I paint everyone, or I try to. I try to capture the moment I am with someone who could be my friend, a neighbor, a celebrity, or a homeless person.”

"It takes courage to do a lot of things. But, in a way, it doesn’t actually take courage, because you are free to do it. It’s like jumping in the water. The water’s cold, but you just jump in. You’ve gotta just jump in all the fucking time."

References

1958 births
Living people
20th-century American painters
21st-century American painters
21st-century American male artists
African-American contemporary artists
American contemporary artists
American contemporary painters
American male painters
American portrait painters
California Institute of the Arts alumni
Painters from California
People from Ventura, California
20th-century African-American painters
21st-century African-American artists
20th-century American male artists